Preethi Vathsalya is a 1984 Indian Kannada-language film, directed by H. R. Bhargava and produced by Bhargava and D. V. Rajaram. The film stars Tiger Prabhakar, Aarathi, Srinath and Sridhar. The film has musical score by Rajan–Nagendra.

Cast

Tiger Prabhakar
Aarathi
Srinath
Sridhar
Saroja
Sudheer
Vishwa Vijetha
Vijaykashi
Ramesh Bhat
Aravind
Uma Shivakumar
M. S. Karanth
Srinivasa Murthy
Rajanand
Hanumanthachar
Keerthiraj
Thimmayya
Lohithashwa
Anuradha
Mico Chandru

Soundtrack
The music was composed by Rajan–Nagendra.

References

External links
 
 

1984 films
1980s Kannada-language films
Films scored by Rajan–Nagendra
Films directed by H. R. Bhargava